Lalsot is a constituency of the Rajasthan Legislative Assembly covering the Lalsot Tehsil in the Dausa district of Rajsathan, India. Lalsot is one of eight assembly constituencies in the Dausa (Lok Sabha constituency). Since 2008, this assembly constituency is numbered 89 amongst 200 constituencies.

Currently this seat belongs to Indian National Congress candidate Parsadi Lal Meena who won in last Assembly election of 2018 Rajasthan Legislative Assembly election by defeating Bharatiya Janta Party candidate Ram Bilas by a margin of 9,074 votes.

Geographical scope
The constituency comprises parts of Tehsil Lalsot.

Member of the Legislative Assembly

Election Results

2018 Assembly Election results
In 2018 Rajasthan Legislative Assembly election total 5 candidate filled nomination and Parsadi Lal Meena (Indian National Congress) won the election, he defeated Ram Bilas (BJP) by a margin of 9,074 votes.

2013 Assembly Election results
In 2013 Rajasthan Legislative Assembly election total 8 candidate filled nomination and Kirodi Lal Meena (National People's Party (India)) won the election, he defeated Parsadi Lal Meena (Indian National Congress) by a margin of 491 votes.

References

Assembly constituencies of Rajasthan
Dausa district